Turbonilla grippi, which is a species of sea snail, is a marine gastropod mollusk in the family Pyramidellidae.

Distribution
This species occurs in the Pacific Ocean off San Diego, California.

References

External links
 To World Register of Marine Species
 To ITIS

grippi
Gastropods described in 1812